James Whitaker may refer to:
James Whitaker (journalist), (1940–2012), British journalist
James Whitaker (architect) (born 1981), British architect
James Whitaker (cricketer) (born 1962), English cricketer
Jim Whitaker (born 1950), U.S. Republican Party politician
James William Whitaker (or Whittaker), English painter

See also
James Whitaker Wright (1846-1904), English mining company owner
James Whittaker (disambiguation)